The Inquiry (also known as The Final Inquiry and Italian: L'inchiesta) is a 2006 Italian historical drama film directed by Giulio Base, and starring Daniele Liotti and Dolph Lundgren. It is a remake of the 1986 film of the same name.

Plot
The story follows a fictional Roman tribune named Titus Valerius Taurus, a veteran of campaigns in Germania, who is sent to Judaea by the emperor Tiberius to investigate the possibility of the divinity of the recently crucified Jesus. Although sceptical early on, Taurus is eventually convinced by a Christian girl he meets there named Tabitha, and chooses to abandon the army and remain there with her.

Cast

See also
 List of historical drama films
 List of films set in ancient Rome

References

External links
 
 

2006 films
Italian historical drama films
Films directed by Giulio Base
Films about Christianity
Films set in the Roman Empire
Films set in the 1st century
Films set in Jerusalem
Remakes of Italian films
2000s historical drama films
Portrayals of Jesus in film
Cultural depictions of Tiberius
Cultural depictions of Pontius Pilate
Cultural depictions of Saint Peter
Portrayals of Mary Magdalene in film
2006 drama films
English-language Italian films
English-language Spanish films
English-language Bulgarian films
2006 multilingual films
Italian multilingual films
Spanish multilingual films
Bulgarian multilingual films
Italian-language Spanish films